The 2017 Singapore Sevens was the eighth tournament of the 2016–17 World Rugby Sevens Series. The tournament was played on 15–16 April 2017 at the Singapore National Stadium in Singapore. This was the sixth time that the Singapore Sevens had a spot on the World Rugby Sevens Series. In an exciting final, Canada completed the 'Miracle on Grass' by jumping out to an early lead and then scoring the decisive try with 2 minutes remaining to beat the United States 26-19 and win its first-ever World Series tournament. Earlier in the day, Canada had triumphed over New Zealand and England while the US defeated Fiji and Australia to set up the first Cup final featuring both North American teams.

Format
Sixteen teams were drawn into four pools of four teams each. Each team played all the others in their pool once. The top two teams from each pool advanced to the Cup quarter finals. The bottom two teams from each group advanced to the Challenge Trophy quarter finals.

Teams

Pool Stages

Pool A

Pool B

Pool C

Pool D

Knockout stage

13th place

Challenge Trophy

5th place

Cup

Tournament placings

Source: World Rugby (archived)

See also
2016-17 World Rugby Sevens Series

References

External links
 World Rugby site
 Singapore official site

Singapore Sevens
S
2017 in Singaporean sport
April 2017 sports events in Asia